Syncarpia is a small group  of trees in the myrtle family (Myrtaceae) described as a genus in 1839. They are native to Queensland and New South Wales in Australia.

They are unusual among the Myrtaceae in that the leaves are opposite rather than alternate as is the norm for the family.

The species are commonly known as turpentine trees due to the odour of their resin.

Species
 Syncarpia glomulifera  (Sm.) Nied. in H.G.A.Engler & K.A.E.Prantl - Queensland, New South Wales; naturalized in Hawaii and in parts of Africa
 Syncarpia hillii  F.M.Bailey - Queensland, New South Wales
 Syncarpia verecunda  A.R.Bean - Queensland

S. glomulifera is considered a weed in Hawaii.

Formerly included
now in Choricarpia Xanthostemon 
 Syncarpia leptopetala - Choricarpia leptopetala
 Syncarpia subargentea - Choricarpia subargentea 
 Syncarpia vertholenii - Xanthostemon verus

References

Myrtales of Australia
Myrtaceae genera
Myrtaceae
Flora of Queensland
Flora of New South Wales
Endemic flora of Australia